Eggshell is the covering of an egg.

Eggshell may also refer to:

 Eggshell (color), an off-white color
 Eggshells (film), an independent film released in 1969
 Eggshells (TV series), a 1991 Australian sitcom